Defaux is a surname popular in Belgium and northeastern France.

Like its cognates/variants De Fauw and Faux, it could derive from fou, fau (Old French for "beech"); be a toponymic surname indicating origin from a place called Faux or Faulx (possibly Faulx-les-Tombes in Wallonia, Belgium; Faux, Court-Saint-Étienne, Belgium; Wavrechain-sous-Faulx in the Nord department; a commune in Pas-de-Calais, or one in the Ardennes) or derive from the adjective "faux" (Middle French: "faulx").

The etymology of the place names in Belgium is ultimately from Latin fagus ("beech") via Old French fou, fau, or from Germanic *falisa, "cliff".

People with the surname Defaux
 Alexandre Defaux  (1826 – 1900), French artist 
 Gérard Defaux (1937 – 2004), French American writer
 Joseph Defaux (1861 – 1931), Belgian representative and mayor

See also
 Faux (surname)

References

Surnames of Belgian origin